Pâmela Rosa (born 19 July 1999) is a regular-footed Brazilian skateboarder from São José dos Campos.

Skateboarding
At the age of 20, Rosa has won 6 X Games medals, including two gold. Rosa competed in the 2019 Street League Skateboarding Tour - London, placing first.

She represented Brazil at the 2020 Summer Olympics.

Pâmela competed in the 2021 Street League Skateboarding Super Crown Final - Jacksonville, FL, USA, and placed first taking the position of "Top Female Street Skater" for the year.[7]

References

1999 births
Living people
Brazilian skateboarders
Brazilian sportswomen
Female skateboarders
Olympic skateboarders of Brazil
People from São José dos Campos
Skateboarders at the 2020 Summer Olympics
X Games athletes
Sportspeople from São Paulo (state)
21st-century Brazilian women